Rich Man, Poor Man is a 1976 American television miniseries based on the 1969 novel of the same name by Irwin Shaw that aired on ABC in one or two-hour episodes mostly on Monday nights over seven weeks, beginning February 1. It was produced by Universal Television and was the second time programming of this nature had been attempted. The first TV miniseries, QB VII, had aired — also on ABC — in 1974. These projects proved to be a critical and ratings success and were the forerunner for similar projects based on literary works, such as Roots and Shōgun. The miniseries stars Peter Strauss, Nick Nolte and Susan Blakely.

It spawned the sequel Rich Man, Poor Man Book II, which aired from September 1976 through March 1977. The network repeated the original series Tuesday nights at 9:00pm from May to June 1977.

Overview
Based on the best-selling 1969 novel by Irwin Shaw, it spanned the period from 1945 through the late 1960s and followed the divergent career courses of the impoverished German American Jordache brothers. Rudy (Peter Strauss) was the titular rich man, a well-educated and very ambitious entrepreneur who triumphed over his background and constructed a corporate and political empire. Poor man Tom (Nick Nolte) was a rebel who eventually turned to boxing to support himself. Axel and Mary were their parents, and Julie Prescott was Rudy's lifelong sweetheart who eventually married him.

Later, another important character appears, the dangerous and eccentric Falconetti, lifelong nemesis of the Jordache Brothers, who is intent on killing them.

While the first series spans a twenty-year period between 1945 and 1965, the second series begins in 1968. The series became a huge success in the countries that aired it.

Primary cast

 Peter Strauss as Rudy Jordache
 Nick Nolte as Tom Jordache
 Susan Blakely as Julie Prescott
 William Smith as Anthony Falconetti
 Ed Asner as Axel Jordache
 Dorothy McGuire as Mary Jordache
 Robert Reed as Teddy Boylan
 Gloria Grahame as Sue Prescott
 Kim Darby as Virginia Calderwood
 Bill Bixby as Willie Abbott
 Fionnula Flanagan as Clothilde
 Tim McIntire as Brad Knight
 Ray Milland as Duncan Calderwood
 Lawrence Pressman as Bill Denton
 Talia Shire as Teresa Santoro
 Craig Stevens as Asher Berg
 Norman Fell as Smitty
 Lynda Day George as Linda Quayles
 George Maharis as Joey Quayles
 Murray Hamilton as Sid Gossett
 Van Johnson as Marsh Goodwin
 Dorothy Malone as Irene Goodwin
 Andrew Duggan as Col. Deiner
 Herbert Jefferson Jr. as Roy Dwyer
 Kay Lenz as Kate Jordache
 Josette Banzet as Miss Lenaut
 Dick Butkus as Al Fanducci
 Dick Sargent as Eddie Heath
 Dennis Dugan as Claude Tinker
 Harvey Jason as Pinky
 Julius Harris as Augie
 Antony Carbone as Lou Martin

Episode list

Production notes
Dean Riesner wrote all twelve episodes, and direction was shared by David Greene and Boris Sagal. The musical score was composed by Alex North.

Awards and nominations

Home media
A&E Home Video released an edited version of Rich Man, Poor Man: The Complete Collection on Region 1 DVD in the United States on September 28, 2010.

References

External links

 

1976 American television series debuts
1976 American television series endings
American Broadcasting Company original programming
1970s American television miniseries
Best Drama Series Golden Globe winners
Television shows based on American novels
Television series by Universal Television